The 28th annual Berlin International Film Festival was held from 22 February to 5 March 1978. Director Wolf Donner successfully managed to shift the festival's date from June to February, a change which has remained ever since. This was the first year the festival was held in February. The festival opened with Opening Night by John Cassavetes and closed with Steven Spielberg's out of competition film Close Encounters of the Third Kind.

The jury awarded the Golden Bear to Spain for its contribution to the festival. The three Spanish films which were screened at the festival and won it were short film Ascensor directed by Tomás Muñoz and feature films La palabras de Max by Emilio Martínez Lázaro and Las truchas by José Luis García Sánchez.

A new section for children was introduced at the festival. The Part 2 of the retrospective dedicated to West German actress Marlene Dietrich was shown at the festival as well as the retrospective called "Censorship – Banned German Films 1933-1945".

Jury

The following people were announced as being on the jury for the festival:
 Patricia Highsmith, writer (United States) - Jury President
 Sergio Leone, director, screenwriter and producer (Italy)
 Theodoros Angelopoulos, director, screenwriter and producer (Greece)
 Jacques Rozier, director and screenwriter (France)
 Konrad Wolf, director and screenwriter (East Germany)
 Frieda Grafe, essayist and film critic (West Germany)
 Antonio Eceiza, director and screenwriter (Spain)
 Ana Carolina Teixeira Soares, director and screenwriter (Brazil)
 Larisa Shepitko, director and screenwriter (Soviet Union)

Films in competition
The following films were in competition for the Golden Bear award:

Out of competition
 Close Encounters of the Third Kind, directed by Steven Spielberg (USA)
 Il prefetto di ferro, directed by Pasquale Squitieri (Italy)
 Sextette, directed by Ken Hughes (USA)
 The Last Wave, directed by Peter Weir (Australia)

Key
{| class="wikitable" width="550" colspan="1"
| style="background:#FFDEAD;" align="center"| †
|Winner of the main award for best film in its section
|-
| colspan="2"| The opening and closing films are screened during the opening and closing ceremonies respectively.
|}

Retrospective

The following films were shown in the retrospective dedicated to Marlene Dietrich (Part 2):

Awards
The following prizes were awarded by the Jury:
 Golden Bear: 
 What Max Said by Emilio Martínez Lázaro
 Las truchas by José Luis García Sánchez
 Ascensor by Tomás Muñoz (short film)
 Silver Bear – Special Jury Prize: A Queda by Ruy Guerra, Nelson Xavier
 Silver Bear for Best Director: Georgi Djulgerov for Avantazh
 Silver Bear for Best Actress: Gena Rowlands for Opening Night
 Silver Bear for Best Actor: Craig Russell for Outrageous!
 Silver Bear for an outstanding artistic contribution:
 Śmierć prezydenta by Jerzy Kawalerowicz
 El brigadista by Octavio Cortázar
 Special Recognition: Deutschland im Herbst
FIPRESCI Award
My Father's Happy Years by Sándor Simó

References

External links
 28th Berlin International Film Festival 1978
 1978 Berlin International Film Festival
 Berlin International Film Festival:1978 at Internet Movie Database

28
1978 film festivals
1978 in West Germany
1970s in West Berlin